At the 1904 Summer Olympics in St. Louis, two weightlifting events were contested.

Medal summary

Participating nations
5 weightlifters from 3 nations competed.

Medal table

References

External links
International Olympic Committee results database

 
1904 Summer Olympics events
1904